Louth is the largest community in St. Catharines, Ontario, Canada. It is on the western side of town. Most of the land is farm land. The community was named for Louth, Lincolnshire in England.

References

Neighbourhoods in St. Catharines